is a Japanese sanshin player and Okinawa min'yō (traditional folk songs) singer.

Life and career
Born on Ishigaki Island in 1967, Yukito learned folk songs and how to play sanshin from his father, a singer of Yaeyama min'yō. He moved to Naha, the capital of Okinawa prefecture, at the age of 18, and began performing live with a band under the name . They first became known for their live album .

In 1994, Yukito formed the band Parsha Club, which represented a fusion of folk music (min'yō), pop, and jazz. He continues to perform and record today, and takes part in many jazz, world music, and other collaborations.

References and notes

Kadekawa, Manabu (ed.). Okinawa Chanpuru Jiten (沖縄チャンプルー事典, "Okinawa Champloo Encyclopedia"). Tokyo: Yamakei Publishers, 2003. p. 25.

1967 births
Japanese male singers
Japanese folk singers
Living people
Musicians from Okinawa Prefecture
Okinawan folk musicians